The men's tournament of the 2015 European Curling Championships were held from November 20 to 28 in Esbjerg, Denmark. The winners of the Group C tournament in Champéry, Switzerland would be promoted to the Group B tournament. The top seven men's teams at the 2015 European Curling Championships would represent their respective nations at the 2016 World Men's Curling Championship in Basel, Switzerland.

Group A

Teams

Round-robin standings

Final round-robin standings

Round-robin results
All draw times are listed in Central European Time (UTC+01).

Draw 1
Saturday, November 21, 9:00

Draw 2
Saturday, November 21, 19:00

Draw 3
Sunday, November 22, 12:00

Draw 4
Monday, November 23, 9:00

Draw 5
Monday, November 23, 19:00

Draw 6
Tuesday, November 24, 14:00

Draw 7
Wednesday, November 25, 8:00

Draw 8
Wednesday, November 25, 16:00

Draw 9
Thursday, November 26, 9:00

Placement game
Thursday, November 26, 14:00

World Challenge Games
The World Challenge Games are held between the eighth-ranked team in the Group A round robin and the winner of the Group B tournament to determine which of these two teams will play at the World Championships.

Challenge 1
Friday, November 27, 19:00

Challenge 2
Saturday, November 28, 9:00

Tiebreaker
Thursday, November 26, 14:00

Playoffs

Semifinals
Friday, November 27, 13:30

Bronze-medal game
Friday, November 27, 19:00

Gold-medal game
Saturday, November 27, 10:00

Player percentages
Round Robin only

Group B

Pool A

Pool B

Round-robin standings

Round-robin results
All draw times are listed in Central European Time (UTC+01).

Group A

Draw 1
Friday, November 20, 8:00

Draw 2
Saturday, November 21, 12:00

Draw 3
Sunday, November 22, 12:00

Draw 4
Sunday, November 22, 20:00

Draw 5
Monday, November 23, 16:00

Draw 6
Tuesday, November 24, 8:00

Draw 7
Wednesday, November 25, 16:00

Group B

Draw 1
Friday, November 20, 17:30

Draw 2
Saturday, November 21, 20:00

Draw 3
Sunday, November 22, 16:00

Draw 4
Monday, November 23, 8:00

Draw 5
Tuesday, November 24, 16:00

Draw 6
Wednesday, November 25, 8:00

Draw 7
Thursday, November 26, 8:00

Tiebreakers
Thursday, November 26, 12:00

Thursday, November 26, 16:00

Relegation round

Relegation Semifinals
Friday, November 27, 9:00

Relegation Final
Saturday, November 28, 9:00

Playoffs

Quarterfinals
Thursday, November 26, 20:00

Semifinals
Friday, November 27, 9:00

Bronze-medal game
Friday, November 27, 13:30

Gold-medal game
Friday, November 27, 13:30

Group C

Teams

Round-robin standings
Final round-robin standings

Round-robin results

Draw 1
Monday, October 12, 16:30

Draw 2
Tuesday, October 13, 8:00

Draw 4
Tuesday, October 13, 16:00

Draw 5
Tuesday, October 13, 20:00

Draw 7
Wednesday, October 14, 12:00

Draw 9
Wednesday, October 14, 20:00

Draw 10
Thursday, October 15, 8:00

Draw 12
Thursday, October 15, 16:00

Draw 13
Thursday, October 15, 20:00

Draw 15
Friday, October 16, 12:00

Draw 17
Friday, October 16, 20:00

Playoffs

1 vs. 2
Saturday, October 17, 10:00

 advance to Group B competitions.
 advance to Second Place Game.

3 vs. 4
Saturday, October 17, 10:00

 advance to Second Place Game.

Second Place Game
Saturday, October 17, 15:00

 advance to Group B competitions.

References
General

Specific

2015 in curling
European Curling Championships